Angelica is a village in the town of Angelica in Allegany County, New York, United States. The population was 869 at the 2010 census. The village and the town are named after Angelica Schuyler Church, a daughter of General Philip Schuyler, sister-in-law of Founding Father Alexander Hamilton and wife of John Barker Church.

History 
The community was the first to be settled in the town of Angelica, in 1802. The village of Angelica was incorporated in 1835. Angelica was formerly the county seat until the county government switched to Belmont.
Founded by Philip Church, nephew of Elizabeth Schuyler Hamilton. Philip Church took a large tract of land that he had inherited in upstate New York and established the town of Angelica (Alexander Hamilton's beloved sister-in-law), named in his mother's honor. (Chernow p 727) In 1830, the population of Angelica was 998.

The Old Allegany County Courthouse was listed on the National Register of Historic Places in 1972.  The Angelica Park Circle Historic District was listed in 1978.

Geography 
The village is located near the center of the town of Angelica, in the valley of Angelica Creek, a tributary of the Genesee River. The Southern Tier Expressway (Interstate 86 and New York State Route 17) passes through the southern part of the village, with access from Exit 31. The expressway leads west  to Olean and east  to Corning.

The county fairgrounds are located in the eastern part of the village. Park Circle, in the village center, includes a roque court. Dubbed the "Town where History Lives", Angelica is home to a number of antique shops which attract shoppers from throughout the state.

Climate
This climatic region is typified by large seasonal temperature differences, with warm to hot (and often humid) summers and cold (sometimes severely cold) winters.  According to the Köppen Climate Classification system, Angelica has a humid continental climate, abbreviated "Dfb" on climate maps.

Demographics

As of the census of 2000, there were 903 people, 366 households, and 243 families residing in the village.  The population density was 420.5 people per square mile (162.2/km2).  There were 409 housing units at an average density of 190.5 per square mile (73.4/km2).  The racial makeup of the village was 98.01% White, 0.78% Native American, 0.11% Asian, and 1.11% from two or more races. Hispanic or Latino of any race were 0.44% of the population.

There were 366 households, out of which 32.5% had children under the age of 18 living with them, 52.2% were married couples living together, 12.6% had a female householder with no husband present, and 33.6% were non-families. 28.1% of all households were made up of individuals, and 12.6% had someone living alone who was 65 years of age or older.  The average household size was 2.47 and the average family size was 3.04.

In the village, the population was spread out, with 27.5% under the age of 18, 8.7% from 18 to 24, 25.6% from 25 to 44, 24.1% from 45 to 64, and 14.1% who were 65 years of age or older.  The median age was 36 years. For every 100 females, there were 87.3 males.  For every 100 females age 18 and over, there were 87.7 males.

The median income for a household in the village was $32,734, and the median income for a family was $37,500. Males had a median income of $27,440 versus $20,893 for females. The per capita income for the village was $15,486.  About 10.2% of families and 12.5% of the population were below the poverty line, including 18.1% of those under age 18 and 8.7% of those age 65 or over.

Education
Angelica youth predominantly attend Genesee Valley Central High School, located in nearby Belmont. GVCS was formed by a merger of the Angelica and Belmont school districts in 1996.

Culture
A thriving theater group, the Angelica Players, has developed in Angelica over the past three years.  They typically produce plays in the spring and during the Christmas season.

References

External links
 Village of Angelica official website
 Angelica community website
 Angelica Merchants Association

Villages in New York (state)
Villages in Allegany County, New York
1802 establishments in New York (state)